A church (or local church) is a religious organization or congregation that meets in a particular location. Many are formally organized, with constitutions and by-laws, maintain offices, are served by clergy or lay leaders, and, in nations where this is permissible, often seek non-profit corporate status.

Local churches often relate with, affiliate with, or consider themselves to be constitutive parts of denominations, which are also called churches in many traditions. Depending on the tradition, these organizations may connect local churches to larger church traditions, ordain and defrock clergy, define terms of membership and exercise church discipline, and have organizations for cooperative ministry such as educational institutions and missionary societies. Non-denominational churches are not part of denominations, but may consider themselves part of larger church movements without institutional expression.

The word church may also be used for other religious communities, although for non-Christian communities the term is sometimes considered archaic or even offensive, while some other non-Christian communities themselves use the word to refer to their community or house of worship.

History
The word church is used in the sense of a distinct congregation in a given city in slightly under half of the 200 uses of the term in the New Testament. John Locke defined a church as "a voluntary society of men, joining themselves together of their own accord in order to the public worshipping of God in such manner as they judge acceptable to him".

A local church may be run using congregationalist polity and may be associated with other similar congregations in a denomination or convention, as are the churches of the Southern Baptist Convention or like German or Swiss Landeskirchen. It may be united with other congregations under the oversight of a council of pastors as are Presbyterian churches. It may be united with other parishes under the oversight of bishops, as are Anglican, Lutheran, Oriental Orthodox, and Eastern Orthodox churches. Finally, the local church may function as the lowest subdivision in a global hierarchy under the leadership of one bishop, such as the pope (the bishop of Rome) of the Roman Catholic Church. Such association or unity is a church's ecclesiastical polity.

Etymology
In the Septuagint, the Greek word "ἐκκλησία" is used to translate the Hebrew "קהל" (qahal). Most Romance and Celtic languages use derivations of this word, either inherited or borrowed from the Latin form ecclesia.

The English language word "church" is from the Old English word cirice, derived from West Germanic *kirika, which in turn comes from the Greek  kuriakē, meaning "of the Lord" (possessive form of  kurios "ruler" or "lord"). Kuriakē in the sense of "church" is most likely a shortening of  kuriakē oikia ("house of the Lord") or  ekklēsia kuriakē ("congregation of the Lord"). Some grammarians and scholars say that the word has uncertain roots and may derive from the Anglo-Saxon "kirke" from the Latin "circus" and the Greek "kuklos" for "circle", which shape is the form in which many religious groups met and gathered. Christian churches were sometimes called  kuriakon (adjective meaning "of the Lord") in Greek starting in the fourth century, but ekklēsia and  basilikē were more common.

The word is one of many direct Greek-to-Germanic loans of Christian terminology, via the Goths. The Slavic terms for "church" (Old Church Slavonic  [crĭky], Russian  [cerkov’], Slovenian cerkev) are via the Old High German cognate .

Description
Among congregational churches, since each local church is autonomous, there are no formal lines of responsibility to organizational levels of higher authority. Deacons of each church are elected by the congregation. In some Baptist congregations, for example, deacons function much like a board of directors or executive committee authorized to make important decisions. Although these congregations typically retain the right to vote on major decisions such as purchasing or selling property, large spending, and the hiring or firing of pastors and other paid ministers. In many such local churches, the role of deacons includes pastoral and nurturing responsibilities. Typically, congregational churches have informal worship styles, less structured services, and may tend toward modern music and celebrations.

Local churches united with others under the oversight of a bishop are normally called "parishes", by Roman Catholic, Eastern Orthodox, Anglican, and Lutheran communions.  Each parish usually has one active parish church, though seldom and historically more than one.  The parish church has always been fundamental to the life of every parish community, especially in rural areas.  For example, in the Church of England, parish churches are the oldest churches to be found in England. A number are substantially of Anglo-Saxon date and all subsequent periods of architecture are represented in the country. Most parishes have churches that date back to the Middle Ages. Thus, such local churches tend to favor traditional, formal worship styles, liturgy, and classical music styles, although modern trends are common as well.

Local parishes of the Roman Catholic Church, like episcopal parishes, favor formal worship styles, and still more traditional structure in services. The importance of formal office is also a distinctive trait; thus a solemn mass may include the presence of officers of the Knights of Columbus as an escort for the regional bishop when he is present. Likewise, vestments are valued to inculcate the solemnity of the Holy Eucharist and are typically more elaborate than in other churches.

A local church may also be a mission, that is a smaller church under the sponsorship of a larger congregation, a bishop, or a greater church hierarchy. Often congregational churches prefer to call such local mission churches "church plants."

A local church may also work in association with parachurch organizations. While parachurch organizations/ministries are vital to accomplishing specific missions on behalf of the church they do not normally take the place of the local church.

Church asylum
  
The Catholic Church has long offered housing to asylum seekers in the form of church asylum. In this tradition, the church provides sanctuary to asylum seekers for a short duration on their congregation's premises.

See also

Ecclesiastical polity
Congregational church
Parish
Particular church
House church
Early centers of Christianity

References

External links 

Christian terminology
Ecclesiology
Types of Christian organization